is a railway station located in Tsubame, Niigata, Japan operated by East Japan Railway Company (JR East).

Lines
Tsubame Station is served by the Yahiko Line, and is 10.3 kilometers from the terminus of the line at Yahiko Station.

Station layout
The station consists of two opposed ground-level side platforms serving two tracks. connected by a footbridge.

The station has a Midori no Madoguchi staffed ticket office. Suica farecards can be used at this station.

Platforms

History
Tsubame Station opened on 20 April 1922. With the privatization of Japanese National Railways (JNR) on 1 April 1987, the station came under the control of JR East.

Passenger statistics
In fiscal 2015, the station was used by an average of 1,040 passengers daily (boarding passengers only).

Surrounding area
Tsubame-Higashi Elementary School

See also
 List of railway stations in Japan

References

External links
 Tsubame Station (Japanese)

Railway stations in Niigata Prefecture
Railway stations in Japan opened in 1922
Stations of East Japan Railway Company
Yahiko Line
Tsubame, Niigata